The following is a list of Michigan State Historic Sites in Chippewa County, Michigan. Sites marked with a dagger (†) are also listed on the National Register of Historic Places in Chippewa County, Michigan.


Current listings

See also
 National Register of Historic Places listings in Chippewa County, Michigan

Sources
 Historic Sites Online – Chippewa County. Michigan State Housing Developmental Authority. Accessed January 23, 2011.

References

Chippewa County
Tourist attractions in Chippewa County, Michigan